Alexander Stevenson was a Scottish professional footballer who made over 120 Football League appearances as a right back for Brentford. He also played in the United States and Northern Ireland.

Career

Early years 
Starting as a centre forward, Stevenson began his career with hometown Scottish League First Division club Airdrieonians. He later dropped down to the Second Division to sign for Armadale and also played in the United States for Detroit.

Brentford 
Stevenson moved to England to sign for Third Division South club Brentford during the 1927 off-season. After converting to a right back, he broke into the team during the 1928–29 season and made 21 appearances. He was an integral part of the team and was part of the team which was promoted as champions to the Second Division in the 1932–33 season. Stevenson lost his right back position to new signing Jack Astley during the 1933–34 season and made just three appearances before departing the club at the end of the campaign. In seven years at Griffin Park, Stevenson made 134 appearances.

Southend United 
Stevenson joined Third Division South club Southend United during the 1934 off-season. He made just 12 appearances for the struggling club and departed at the end of the 1934–35 season.

Later career 
Stevenson moved to Northern Ireland for a spell with Irish League club Ards, managed by former Brentford full back partner Tom Adamson. He ended his career back in Scotland with Highland League club Ross County.

Honours 
Brentford
 Football League Third Division South: 1932–33

Career statistics

References

Footballers from Airdrie, North Lanarkshire
Scottish footballers
Brentford F.C. players
English Football League players
1903 births
Airdrieonians F.C. (1878) players
Scottish Football League players
Association football forwards
Scottish expatriate footballers
Scottish expatriate sportspeople in the United States
Southend United F.C. players
Ards F.C. players
NIFL Premiership players
Year of death missing
Ross County F.C. players
Armadale F.C. players